In military terms, 96th Squadron or 96 Squadron may refer to:

 96th Airlift Squadron, a United States Army Air Force unit
 96th Air Refueling Squadron, a United States Army Air Force unit
 96th Aero Squadron, a World War I United States Army Air Service unit
 96th Bomb Squadron, a United States Army Air Force unit
 96th Flying Training Squadron, a United States Army Air Force unit
 96th Troop Carrier Squadron, a World War II United States Army Air Services unit
 VF-96, a United States Navy unit
 No. 96 Squadron RAF, a unit of the United Kingdom